Rangalia is a village of Bhangura Upazila in Pabna District, Bangladesh.

References

Populated places in Pabna District